Jonathan Root may refer to:

 Jon Root (born 1964), former American volleyball player
 Jonathan Root (photographer) (born 1959), English portrait photographer
 Jonathan Root, early settler of Southington, Connecticut, namesake of the Jonathan Root House